Alexander Stenhouse (11 May 1910 – 9 May 1992) was a football (soccer) player who represented New Zealand at the international level.

Stenhouse played three official A-international matches for the All Whites in 1933, all on tour against trans-Tasman neighbours Australia, the first a 2–4 loss on 5 June 1933, followed by a 4–6 loss and another 2–4 loss on 17 and 24 June respectively.

Stenhouse arrived in New Zealand with his parents at about age 12. He played as a junior at King Edward Technical College Old Boys in Dunedin until the Third Grade. In 1931 he transferred to Mosgiel AFC and first appeared in a friendly match against Mornington AFC on 4 April 1931. He made his full First Team debut against Seacliff AFC on 23 May 1931, but played the majority of the season for the Second Grade team.

Stenhouse was the only son of James Stenhouse and Isabella McLucas who were married 18 July 1905.  Alex married 3 April 1939 to Dorothy, They had three sons, Jim (b. 1942), Donald (b. 1946)and David (b. 1949)  
He was nicknamed "Chooka" by his workmates on account of his surname sounding like "hen-house"

Stenhouse was a manager at a painting firm. He died in Dunedin just before his 82nd birthday, and was cremated.

References

New Zealand association footballers
New Zealand international footballers
Painters and decorators
Association footballers from Dunedin
1910 births
1992 deaths
People from Perthshire
Scottish emigrants to New Zealand
Association footballers not categorized by position